Șcheii Brașovului (or more recently Obere Vorstadt; traditional Romanian name: Bulgărimea, colloquially Șchei) is the old ethnically Bulgarian and Romanian neighborhood of Brașov, a city in southeastern Transylvania, Romania. 

This village-like section of the town is mostly made up of small houses built along narrow roads with gardens and small fields on the slopes of the Tâmpa Mountain.

History

Until the 17th century, the inhabitants of Șchei were forbidden from owning property inside the city walls. The people living in the Șchei could only enter the town at certain times and had to pay a toll at the Catherine's Gate for the privilege of selling their produce inside the town. Catherine's Gate was the only entrance for the Romanians — they were not allowed to use the other four entrances, such as the Șchei Gate. It was in Șchei that Brașov's first Romanian School was established, next to the Romanian Orthodox church of St. Nicholas.

Researchers maintain the Șchei were ethnic Bulgarians who later adopted the Romanian language and ethnic identity. The neighborhood's name has been recorded through the ages as follows: Bolgarszek (1611), Scheu Brașovului, orașul Schei lângă Cetatea Brașovolui (1700), Bolgarsek, Șchei de lângă Brașov (1701), Șchiiaii Brașovului (1708), Bolgaria Brașovului (1723), Șchei lângă cetate Brașovului unde-i zic Bolgara, Șchiai (1724), obștea din Bolgarseghi (1773), sărăcimea obștii Bolgarsegului (1774), Bolgarsec, Biserica Bolgarseghiului (1813), Bolgarsechi (1816), Bolgarsăchiu (1817), etc.

According to Radu Tempea's Istoria besérecei Șchéilor Brașovului manuscript of 1899, the Bulgarians arrived in Brașov in the late 14th century, more exactly 1392. Their arrival is linked to the reconstruction of the Black Church, which had been destroyed by the Tatars in the 13th century, the reconstruction beginning 1385.

By the beginning of the 19th century, the Bulgarian population of Șcheii Brașovului had been gradually Romanianized. An 1829 statistic on the population of Bolgárszeg, which stated the neighbourhood had a population of 5,829, did include Bulgari ("Bulgarians") in the list along with Valachi ("Romanians"), but noted no people of that ethnicity.

Notable people
Ioan Bogdan (1864–1919), linguist, historian, philologist
Allen Coliban (1979–), mayor of Brașov

See also
Șchei
Tocile Church

Gallery

References

Districts of Brașov
Bulgarian communities in Romania